The Antidote is the debut album by English jazz guitarist Ronny Jordan, that was released by Island Records in 1992.

Reception
Allmusic awarded the album with 4.5 stars. The album followed the release of the Miles Davis composition So What as a single, which was popularised by London DJs and went on to become a classic of the 1990s acid jazz genre. The third single, the smooth jazz-flavoured After Hours, became Jordan's first single to reach the US R&B charts.

Track listing

Personnel 
 Ronny Jordan – vocals, guitar, keyboards, synthesizer, programming
 Phillip Bent – flute
 Joe Bashorun – piano
 Adrian York – organ
 Hugo Delmirani – organ, vibraphone
 Arnie Somogyi – bass
 Longsy D – drum programming
 Isabel Roberts – vocals
 IG Culture – rap
 Recorded at PLJ Studios by Patrick Longmore

Charts

References 

1992 albums
Acid jazz albums